Coy Pugh (born February 27, 1952) was an American Methodist minister, businessman, and politician.

Born in Chicago, Illinois, Pugh received his bachelor's degree in inner cities studies from Northeastern Illinois University and his master's degree in theology from University of Chicago. He served as a Methodist minister and was a business owner. From 1993 to 2001, Pugh served in the Illinois House of Representatives and was a Democrat.

Notes

1952 births
Living people
Politicians from Chicago
Northeastern Illinois University alumni
University of Chicago alumni
American Methodist clergy
Businesspeople from Illinois
Democratic Party members of the Illinois House of Representatives